char char is one of the Aanaas in the Oromia Region of Ethiopia. It is part of the West Hararghe Zone. It was separated from Guba Koricha Aanaa.

Demographics 
The 2007 national census reported a total population for this woreda of 81,646, of whom 42,030 were men and 39,616 were women; 6,491 or 7.95% of its population were urban dwellers. The majority of the inhabitants said they were Muslim, with 72.12% of the population reporting they observed this belief, while 15.58% of the population practiced Ethiopian Orthodox Christianity and 2.9% were Catholics.

Notes 

Districts of Oromia Region